This is a list of mayors of the Council of the Municipality of Hunter's Hill, a local government area in northern Sydney, New South Wales, Australia. The Municipality was first incorporated on 12 March 1861. Since 2004, the Mayor has been directly elected for a four-year term by the voters in the Municipality. The official title of mayors while holding office is His/Her Worship the Mayor of the Municipality of Hunter's Hill. The current mayor is Councillor Zac Miles, an Liberal Party politician, elected on 4 December 2021.

List of incumbents
The following individuals have served as Mayor of the Council of the Municipality of Hunter's Hill:

References

External links
Previous Mayors of Hunter's Hill - Hunter's Hill Council

Municipality of Hunter's Hill
Mayors of Hunter's Hill
Hunter's Hill
Mayors Hunter's Hill